Everybody Loves a Clown is the third studio album by American band Gary Lewis & the Playboys, and was released in 1965 on Liberty Records, LRP-3428. It is the third of three charting albums released by the band in 1965, and it was the band's third highest charting original album reaching number 44 on the Billboard 200. The single "Everybody Loves a Clown" was the band's fourth single in a row to chart on the Billboard Hot 100, reaching number 4 in November 1965.

Background
Riding on their string of successful singles, Lewis and producer Snuff Garrett went back into the studio to record the band's third album. The single from the album "Everybody Loves a Clown" was released in August, the same month as their previous album A Session with Gary Lewis and the Playboys. The new album was released three months later in November 1965. The album followed their usual formula of a couple of original compositions along with covers of recent hits by artists such as the Fleetwoods, Manfred Mann, Everly Brothers and Johnny Burnette. Their single from their next album "She's Just My Style" was released in the same month as this album.

Track listing
 "Everybody Loves a Clown" (Gary Lewis, Leon Russell, Tom Lesslie) – 2:26
 "Mr. Blue" (Dewayne Blackwell) – 2:29
 "Chip Chip" (Jeff Barry, Clifford Crawford, Arthur Resnick) – 2:11
 "I Gotta Find Cupid" (Tommy Boyce, Bobby Hart, Russell, Lesslie) – 2:48
 "Let Me Tell Your Fortune" (Cliff Crofford) – 2:12
 "(Till) I Kissed You" (Don Everly) – 2:19 
 "Tossin' and Turnin'" (Ritchie Adams, Malou Rene) – 2:41
 "My Special Angel" (Jimmy Duncan) – 2:20
 "We'll Work It Out" (Gary Geld, Peter Udell) – 2:06
 "Sha La La" (Robert Mosley, Robert Napoleon Taylor) – 2:41
 "Time Stands Still" (Lewis, Russell, Lesslie) – 2:04
 "Dreamin'" (Barry Devorzon, Ted Ellis) – 2:25

Personnel

Gary Lewis and the Playboys
 Gary Lewis – vocals, drums on tracks 1, 7, 11
 Tommy Tripplehorn – lead guitar
 Carl Radle – bass, vocals 
 John R. West – electric cordovox
 Jim Keltner – drums except on tracks 1, 7, 11
 Dave Walker- rhythm guitar on tracks 1, 7, 11

These were the Playboys at the time of the recording, although many session musicians were also used.

Technical
 Snuff Garrett – music producer
 Leon Russell – arranger
 Woody Woodward – design
 Jerry Lewis, Patti Palmer – liner notes

Charts

Singles

References

1965 albums
Gary Lewis & the Playboys albums
Liberty Records albums
Albums produced by Snuff Garrett